Yue Qingshuang (born October 7, 1985 in Harbin, Heilongjiang; usually referred to in the media as Qingshuang Yue) is a Chinese curler. She previously played second on the Chinese national team, skipped by Wang Bingyu.

Currently as a coach, Yue guided the Chinese wheelchair curling team to gold medals at the 2018 Winter Paralympics and 2022 Winter Paralympics.

Biography

Yue played in her first international tournament at the 2002 Pacific Curling Championships. Yue skipped the Chinese team, despite having just curled for two years. The team finished the tournament with an 0–8 record.

The team had a much better showing, winning a silver medal. After that, she was promoted to the third position on the team, and subsequently won the 2005 Pacific Junior Curling Championships. They then finished 9th at the  but improved on their record at the 2005 World Women's Curling Championship where they finished 7th.

However, their poor record at the 2005 World Juniors disqualified the team from returning to the 2006 tournament. The team was still in the 2006 Ford World Women's Curling Championship where it had a best ever 5th-place finish. Yue was back playing second on the team at this point.

The team failed to improve on their 5th place World Championship performance of 2006, placing in 7th place at the 2007 World Women's Curling Championship. This was followed by a silver medal at the 2008 Ford World Women's Curling Championship, with Yue back at her normal second position.

The team won gold at the 2008 Pacific Curling Championships and at the 2009 Winter Universiade and they became World Champions at the 2009 Mount Titlis World Women's Curling Championship. At the 2010 Winter Olympics Yue and her teammates won the bronze medal, the first ever Olympic medal in curling for China.

Teammates 
2009 Gangneung World Championships

2010 Vancouver Olympic Games

Wang Bingyu, Skip

Liu Yin, Third

Zhou Yan, Lead

Liu Jinli, Alternate

References

External links 
 

1985 births
Living people
Chinese female curlers
Curlers at the 2010 Winter Olympics
Curlers at the 2014 Winter Olympics
Olympic bronze medalists for China
Olympic curlers of China
Sportspeople from Harbin
World curling champions
Olympic medalists in curling
Medalists at the 2010 Winter Olympics
Asian Games medalists in curling
Curlers at the 2003 Asian Winter Games
Curlers at the 2007 Asian Winter Games
Medalists at the 2003 Asian Winter Games
Medalists at the 2007 Asian Winter Games
Asian Games bronze medalists for China
Universiade medalists in curling
Pacific-Asian curling champions
Universiade gold medalists for China
Competitors at the 2009 Winter Universiade
Chinese curling coaches
21st-century Chinese women